Miss Corsica is a French beauty pageant which selects a representative for the Miss France national competition from the region of Corsica. The first Miss Corsica was crowned in 1920, although the competition was not organized regularly until 1988.

The current Miss Corsica is Orianne Meloni, who was crowned Miss Corsica 2022 on 22 July 2022. One woman from Corsica has been crowned Miss France:
Pauline Pô, who was crowned Miss France 1921

Results summary
Miss France: Pauline Pô (1920)
1st Runner-Up: Marie-Ange Contart Caitucoli (1992); Stéphanie Faby (2000); Eva Colas (2017)
3rd Runner-Up: Lydie Morochi (1972); Marie-Christine Mattei (1984)
5th Runner-Up: Karine Colonna (1999)
Top 12/Top 15: Corinne Ferrandiz (1988); Marie-Pierre Raffaelli (1991); Christelle Godani (1993); Sabrina Chabrier (2002); Jade Morel (2010); Noémie Leca (2020); Emma Renucci (2021)

Titleholders

Notes

References

External links

Miss France regional pageants
Beauty pageants in France
Women in France